Mike Lobell is an American film producer. He is known for his collaborations with Andrew Bergman.

Filmography 
He was producer for all films unless otherwise noted.

Film

Television

References

External links 
 

American film producers
Year of birth missing (living people)
Living people